Best of Chris Isaak is a greatest hits album by Chris Isaak released on May 9, 2006 on the Reprise/Warner Bros. Records label. The 18 song collection has three new tracks: "King Without a Castle", "Let's Have a Party" and a cover of Cheap Trick's "I Want You to Want Me".

Track listing

Bonus DVD
"Wicked Game" (directed by Herb Ritts)
"Dancin'" (Mary Lambert)
"Somebody's Crying" (Bill Pope and Chris Isaak)
"San Francisco Days" (Gus Van Sant)
"Blue Spanish Sky" (Bruce Weber)
"Baby Did a Bad, Bad Thing" (Herb Ritts)
"Can't Do a Thing (To Stop Me)" (Chris Isaak)
"Let Me Down Easy" (Logan)
"Blue Hotel" (Mark Lebon)
"Dark Moon" (Nicola Pecorini)
"Don't Make Me Dream About You" (Geoffrey Barish)
"Think of Tomorrow" (Jonathan Bendis)
"Go Walking Down There" (Bill Pope)
"You Owe Me Some Kind of Love" (Jean-Baptiste Mondino)
"Gone Ridin'" (Theodorus Bafaloukos)
"Please" (Jonas Pate and Josh Pate)
"Washington Square" (Joe Thomas)
"Wicked Game" (European version) (Herb Ritts)
"Solitary Man" (Larry Clark)

Note: the "Solitary Man" video (not listed on the CD cover) is only available with the audio commentary on.

Writing and publishing credits
All songs written by Chris Isaak and published by C. Isaak Music Publishing Co. (ASCAP) except: 
 "Can't Do a Thing to Stop Me" written by Chris Isaak and Brian Elliot. Published by C. Isaak Music Publishing Co./Elliot Jacobsen Music (ASCAP)
 "Only the Lonely" written by Joe Melson and Roy Orbison. Published by Barbara Orbison Music Company/Roy Orbison Music Company/Sony/ATV Acuff Rose Music (BMI)
 "I Want You to Want Me" written by Rick Nielsen. Published by Screen-Gems-EMI Music, Inc./Adult Music (BMI).

All songs mastered by Steve Hall at Future Disc.

Charts

Certifications

References

2006 greatest hits albums
Chris Isaak albums
2006 video albums
Music video compilation albums
Reprise Records compilation albums
Reprise Records video albums